The Triple Islands are three small rocky islands lying close east of the tip of Zélée Glacier Tongue and  south-southeast of the Double Islands. They were photographed from the air by U.S. Navy Operation Highjump, 1946–47, and were charted and named by the French Antarctic Expedition, 1949–51.

See also 
 List of Antarctic and sub-Antarctic islands

References 

Islands of Adélie Land